Elizabeth Norberg-Schulz (born 27 January 1959) is a Norwegian-Italian operatic soprano.

Early life and education
Elizabeth Norberg-Schulz is the daughter of Norwegian architectural theorist Christian Norberg-Schulz, and Italian translator and writer Anna Maria de Dominicis. She grew up in Ris, Oslo. When she was young she took lessons in voice with Anne Brown, as well as lessons in piano, ballet and theatre.

She started studies at the Conservatorio Santa Cecilia in Rome in 1974, first piano and from 1974 in voice with Rosina Vedrani Laporta, with whom she studied for ten years. She got a diploma in piano in 1978 and in voice in 1982.

She has also studied with John Shirley-Quirk, Peter Pears, and for a number of years with Elisabeth Schwarzkopf.

Career

She has performed in many of the world's leading opera houses and companies, including La Scala, Teatro dell'Opera di Roma, Teatro Comunale di Bologna, Teatro Massimo di Palermo, Teatro Regio di Torino, Teatro San Carlo in Naples, Teatro Carlo Felice in Genoa, La Fenice in Venice, the New York Metropolitan Opera, the Lyric Opera of Chicago, Royal Opera, Covent Garden, Opéra Bastille, La Monnaie in Brussels, Teatro Real in Madrid, Opéra de Genève, Bavarian State Opera in Munich, Vienna State Opera and the Norwegian National Opera.

Since 2006 she has been professor in voice and interpretation at the University of Stavanger in Norway.

Personal life
Norberg-Schulz is married to Italian conductor Paolo Bonolis. The couple have one son.

Opera roles
Her principal roles include (in alphabetical order):
 AdeleDie Fledermaus (Johann Strauss II): Metropolitan Opera (New York)
 AdinaAdina (Rossini): La Scala (Milan), Rome, Naples, Vienna State Opera
 AsteriaTamerlano (Handel): Florence, Halle, London, Théâtre des Champs-Élysées (Paris)
 ConstanceDialogues des Carmélites (Dialogues of the Carmelites) (Poulenc): La Scala
 GildaRigoletto (Verdi): Vienna, Spoleto, Palermo, Treviso, Oslo
 GretelHänsel und Gretel (Hansel and Gretel) (Humperdinck): Chicago
 LiùTurandot (Puccini): Covent Garden, Athens, Bologna
 LuciaLucia di Lammermoor (Donizetti): Vienna State Opera, Spoleto, Oslo
 Manon LescautManon (Massenet): Vienna State Opera
 MicaëlaCarmen (Bizet): Opéra Bastille (Paris), Rome, Oslo
 MimìLa bohème (Puccini): Glyndebourne Festival, Oslo
 MusettaLa bohème (Puccini): Florence, Vienna State Opera
 NannettaFalstaff (Verdi): La Scala, Salzburg, Vienna State Opera, Madrid
 NorinaDon Pasquale (Donizetti): Munich, Hamburg, Macerata, Naples
 OscarUn ballo in maschera (Verdi): Metropolitan Opera, Chicago, Vienna State Opera, Oslo
 PaminaDie Zauberflöte (The Magic Flute) (Mozart): Chicago, Madrid, Salzburg Festival, Vienna State Opera, Bologna
 SusannaLe nozze di Figaro (The Marriage of Figaro) (Mozart): La Scala, Vienna
 ZerlinaDon Giovanni (Mozart): Rome, Naples, Vienna
 RomildaSerse (Handel): Florence, Halle, London, Les Arts Florissants (ensemble)

Her festival appearances include the Rossini Opera Festival of Pesaro, where she has sung Corinna (Il viaggio a Reims, Rossini), Anaïs (Anaï) (Mosè in Egitto, Moses in Egypt, Rossini), Jemmy (Guglielmo Tell, William Tell, Rossini) and Giulia (La scala di seta, The Silken Ladder, Rossini). They also include Salzburg, Montreux, Spoleto, Macerata, the Beethoven Festival (de) in Bonn, and the Handel Festival, Halle.

Concert repertoire
Her concert appearances have included (in alphabetical order of orchestras, and conductors): 
 Bavarian Radio Symphony Orchestra. With Sir Colin Davis): Mahler, Symphony No. 8
 Bergen Philharmonic Orchestra. With Aldo Ceccato: Mahler, Symphony No. 4; Berg, Sieben frühe Lieder; de Falla, Atlántida; Brahms, A German Requiem
 Berlin Philharmonic. With Claudio Abbado: Schumann, Requiem for Mignon; Brahms, A German Requiem
 Boston Symphony Orchestra. With Seiji Ozawa: Ravel, L'enfant et les sortilèges
 Chicago Symphony Orchestra. With Sir Georg Solti: Haydn, The Creation
 Dresden Staatskapelle. With Giuseppe Sinopoli: Beethoven, Symphony No. 9; Richard Strauss, Four Last Songs; Mozart, Requiem
 . With Valery Gergiev: Mozart, Requiem
 With Riccardo Muti: Mozart, Requiem
 Munich Philharmonic. With Claudio Abbado: Pergolesi, Salve Regina. With Marcello Viotti: Lili Boulanger, Clairières dans le ciel
 New York Philharmonic. With Kurt Masur: Debussy, Le Martyre de saint Sébastien
 Orchestre de Paris. With Semyon Bychkov: Mahler, Symphony No. 2; Beethoven, Symphony No. 9
 Oslo Philharmonic. With Mariss Jansons: opera recital
 With Giuseppe Sinopoli: Mahler, Symphony No. 4
 RAI National Symphony Orchestra. With Jeffrey Tate: Mahler, Symphony No. 2; Mahler, Symphony No. 4; Berg, "Der Wein"
 San Francisco Symphony. With Herbert Blomstedt: Brahms, A German Requiem
 Vienna Philharmonic. With Claudio Abbado: Brahms, A German Requiem
 With Sir Georg Solti: Mozart, Great Mass in C minor, K. 427

Awards
Early in her career she won the Salzburg "Mozart Wettbewerb" and the Spoleto "Sperimentale" prizes, and in 1993, she was awarded the Grieg Prize by the Grieg Academy in Oslo. She has also received the "Minerva Prize" (2004) and the "Verdi Prize" (2006). In 2004, King Harald V of Norway, made her a Knight of the Order of St. Olav, and in 2006, the Italian President Giorgio Napolitano made her a "Commander of the Italian Republic".

Recordings

Norberg-Schulz's recordings for Philips, Decca, EMI, Ricordi and BMG include Mozart's Mass in C minor, Verdi's Falstaff with Solti (Nanetta), Brahms' Ein deutsches Requiem with Blomstedt (Grammy Award), Mahler's Symphony Number 8 with Sir Colin Davis, and Tamerlano with Trevor Pinnock (Asteria). She has also recorded a recital disc of songs by Edvard Grieg with the pianist Håvard Gims which received the Grieg Award.

References

External links
Biography: Elizabeth Norberg-Schulz (Soprano) on bach-cantatas.com

1959 births
Living people
Musicians from Oslo
Norwegian people of Italian descent
Norwegian operatic sopranos
Academic staff of the University of Stavanger
Naturalised citizens of Italy
20th-century Norwegian women opera singers
21st-century Norwegian women opera singers
Conservatorio Santa Cecilia alumni